Dovercourt is a small seaside town and former civil parish, now in the parish of Harwich, in the Tendring district, in the county of Essex, England. It is older than its smaller but better-known neighbour, the port of Harwich, and appears in the Domesday Book of 1086. Today the towns are contiguous. In 1921 the parish had a population of 7695. 

Dovercourt is a seaside resort which offers shops and cafes for visitors and residents. The main shopping area is The High Street, with shops from independents to the national chains. The town is served by Dovercourt railway station.

History
The Saxon lord Wulwin/Ulwin was lord in 1066; by 1086 the estate was in possession of Aubrey de Vere I and remained part of the barony of his descendants the Earls of Oxford until the 16th century.  It formed part of the dowry of Juliana de Vere when she married Hugh Bigod in the mid-12th century, and the sub-tenancy passed to the Bigod earls of Norfolk who held it as one knight's fee of the Veres.  Countess Juliana's son Roger Bigod, 2nd Earl of Norfolk founded a chapel at Harwich and granted it to Colne Priory, Essex, a Vere foundation.

The present town dates back to 1845 when John Bagshaw, an East India merchant, moved to the area and bought the land where Dovercourt now stands. He developed plans to develop a new resort overlooking the sea  with the help of W.H. Lindsey, a London architect. He started the project in 1845 by building a mansion, Cliff House, for himself and his family and actively promoted the railway link to the Harwich area. When a chalybeate spring was discovered in the grounds of Cliff House, Bagshaw extended the property to incorporate a spa, library, pump room, and conservatory. He next developed Orwell Terrace where his son Robert John Bagshaw, like his father an MP for Harwich, moved into Banksea House in 1857. However the development project, which included Marine Parade and the Cliff Estate, caused Bagshaw financial difficulties and he was declared bankrupt in 1859. Although Cliffe House was demolished in 1909 and the Spa in 1920, most of his other developments still stand.

On 1 October 1925 the parish was abolished and merged with Harwich St Nicholas to form Harwich.

In 1939 Warner's Holiday Camp, in Low Road, was used for refugee children arriving in the UK in the Kindertransport mission. This was carried out under the direction of Anna Essinger and aided by several of the staff from Bunce Court School, In the 1980s Warner's was used as the set for the filming of BBC sitcom Hi-de-Hi!. The site, with the original 1930s chalets, was transformed into Maplin’s. It is now a housing estate known as Hightrees.

The Dovercourt shrine

In the 1400s All Saints Church in Main Road drew thousands of pilgrims after the wooden cross (or rood) on its rood screen became a shrine. "It acquired a miraculous reputation and was said to have spoken on some occasions," said John Ashdown-Hill, the historian. The 1600 version of the play Grim, the Collier of Croydon, says: "And now the rood of Dovercourt did speak, Confirming his opinions to true." 

The accounts of John Howard, 1st Duke of Norfolk, show that he donated money to the shrine "including clothing in 1482 used to dress the image of Christ on the rood," according to Ashdown-Hill. 

The 1981 edition of  says that John Foxe reported that the crowd in the church was so great "no man could shut the door". It adds that the word "Dovercourt" can mean "a confused gabble, a babel [sic]".  

In 1532 four young Protestants from Dedham, Essex and East Bergholt rode to Dovercourt. According to Foxe, they were intrigued by the rood's miraculous reputation and wanted to see whether it could defend itself. They took down the rood and burnt it. Three of the men were caught and hanged. The site of the burning is commemorated by the road name Holyrood on a nearby 1960s housing estate.

Dovercourt women
 notes that the females of Dovercourt had a reputation for being "scolds and chattering women". This is possibly connected with the Dovercourt shrine, above. The book cites Lines in the Belfry of St Peter's, Shaftesbury, as saying: "When bells ring round and their order be, They do denote how neighbours should agree; But when they claim, the harsh sound spoils the sport, And 'tis like women keeping Dovercourt."

Lighthouses
In 1863 Trinity House erected a pair of cast iron screw-pile lighthouses on the beach, used until 1917 to guide ships around Landguard Point. They served as leading lights and functioned in conjunction with a third lighthouse (a sector light established in 1861) on Landguard Point itself: from seaward the two Dovercourt lights aligned indicated the initial course of approach; vessels would keep to this course until the colour of the Landguard light was seen to change from red to white, whereupon the vessel would take a northerly course into Harwich Haven. When first built the Dovercourt lights used oil lamps and reflectors, and both displayed a fixed (i.e. steady) light. In 1878 the High Light was improved with the installation of a prismatic lens assembly, and in the early 1900s it was given a flashing characteristic following the introduction of gas, in place of oil, as the illuminant for both lights. 

In 1917 Harwich Harbour Board took over responsibility for navigation marks in the vicinity and chose to mark the deep-water channel with a series of lighted buoys, rendering the lighthouses redundant. The lights were discontinued, but the structures left in situ. In 1975 both lighthouses were designated as a scheduled monument, together with the stone causeway which runs between them. They were restored in the 1980s; however, following a detailed survey they were placed on Historic England's Heritage at Risk Register in 2019.

Gallery

See also 
 John Bagshaw - developer of Dovercourt. MP for Harwich.
 Robert John Bagshaw - son of the above. MP for Harwich
 Hanna Bergas
 Charles Fryatt - GER captain, captured and shot in 1916
 Roy Salvadori - winner of 1959 Le Mans 24 hours and Formula One driver
 Constance Lindsay Taylor, author, playwright and screenwriter

References

Populated coastal places in Essex
Towns in Essex
Beaches of Essex
Seaside resorts in Essex
Former civil parishes in Essex
Tendring